Ringwood and Fordingbridge was a rural district in Hampshire from 1932 to 1974.

It was formed by the merger of part of the disbanded Christchurch Rural District along with Ringwood Rural District and Fordingbridge Rural District.  Its main urban centres were Ringwood and Fordingbridge.

The district was split in 1974, between the districts of New Forest, East Dorset and Christchurch.

References

Districts of England abolished by the Local Government Act 1972
History of Hampshire
History of Dorset